Bror Lars Astley Mellberg (9 December 1923 − 8 September 2004) was a Swedish footballer who played as a forward. He played for the Sweden national team at the 1950 FIFA World Cup and 1958 FIFA World Cup where Sweden finished third and second, respectively.

Career statistics

International 

 Scores and results list Sweden's goal tally first, score column indicates score after each Mellberg goal.

Honours 
Sweden

 FIFA World Cup runner-up: 1958

 FIFA World Cup third place: 1950

References

External links
 
 
 

1923 births
2004 deaths
Swedish footballers
Association football forwards
Sweden international footballers
Allsvenskan players
AIK Fotboll players
Serie A players
Serie B players
Genoa C.F.C. players
Ligue 1 players
Ligue 2 players
Red Star F.C. players
FC Sochaux-Montbéliard players
1950 FIFA World Cup players
1958 FIFA World Cup players
Swedish expatriate footballers
Swedish expatriate sportspeople in Italy
Expatriate footballers in Italy
Swedish expatriate sportspeople in France
Expatriate footballers in France